Tilney All Saints is a civil parish in the English county of Norfolk.
For the purposes of local government, it falls within the district of King's Lynn and West Norfolk.

The villages name origin is uncertain. 'Useful island' or 'Tila's island'.

Notes 

http://kepn.nottingham.ac.uk/map/place/Norfolk/Tilney%20All%20Saints

External links

King's Lynn and West Norfolk
Villages in Norfolk
Civil parishes in Norfolk